Leonardo "Léo" Borges da Silva (born 3 January 2001) is a Brazilian professional footballer who plays as a left-back for Polish club Pogoń Szczecin.

Club career
Borges signed with Internacional in 2017. Borges made his professional debut with Internacional in a 0-0 Copa Libertadores tie with América de Cali on 30 September 2020.

On 3 August 2021, he joined Porto B in Portugal on a season-long loan.

On 10 July 2022, Polish side Pogoń Szczecin announced they had signed Borges on a three-year contract.

References

External links
 
 Internacional profile 

2001 births
Living people
People from Pelotas
Sportspeople from Rio Grande do Sul
Brazilian footballers
Association football fullbacks
Sport Club Internacional players
FC Porto B players
Pogoń Szczecin players
Campeonato Brasileiro Série A players
Liga Portugal 2 players
Ekstraklasa players
III liga players
Brazilian expatriate footballers
Expatriate footballers in Portugal
Brazilian expatriate sportspeople in Portugal
Expatriate footballers in Poland
Brazilian expatriate sportspeople in Poland